Lake Parawanui is a lake in the Northland Region of New Zealand. The center of the lake lies at the latitude of -36.05819 and is known to be 46 meters above sea level.

See also
List of lakes in New Zealand

References

Parawanui
Kaipara District